The Moriori are the native Polynesian people of the Chatham Islands (Rēkohu in Moriori;  in Māori), New Zealand. Moriori originated from Māori settlers from the New Zealand mainland around 1500 CE. This was near the time of the shift from the archaic to classic Māori culture on the main islands of New Zealand. Oral tradition records multiple waves of migration to the Chatham Islands, starting in the 16th century. Over several centuries these settlers' culture diverged from mainland Māori, developing a distinctive language (which started as a dialect but gradually became only partially mutually intelligible with Māori), mythology, artistic expression and way of life. Currently there are around 700 people who identify as Moriori, most of whom no longer live on the Chatham Islands.  During the late 19th century some prominent anthropologists mistakenly proposed that Moriori were pre-Māori settlers of mainland New Zealand, and possibly Melanesian in origin.

Early Moriori formed tribal groups based on eastern Polynesian social customs and organisation. Later, a prominent pacifist culture emerged; this was known as the law of nunuku, based on the teachings of the 16th century Moriori leader Nunuku-whenua. This culture made it easier for Taranaki Māori invaders to nearly exterminate them in the 1830s during the Musket Wars. This was the Moriori genocide, in which the Moriori were either murdered or enslaved by members of the Ngāti Mutunga and Ngāti Tama iwi, killing or displacing nearly 95% of the Moriori population.

The Moriori, however, were not extinct, and gained aroha and recognition as New Zealand's second indigenous people over the course of the next century, even if what happened to them was taught sparingly due to government suppression of knowledge of the genocide. Their culture and language underwent a revival, and Moriori names for their islands were prioritised. In February 2020, the New Zealand government signed a treaty with tribal leaders, giving them rights enshrined in law and the Moriori people at large an apology, returning stolen remains of those killed in the genocide, and gifting NZD$18 million in reparations. On 23 November 2021, the New Zealand government enshrined in law the treaty between Moriori and the Crown. The law is called the Moriori Claims Settlement Bill. It includes an agreed summary history that begins with the words "Moriori karāpuna (ancestors) were the waina-pono (original inhabitants) of Rēkohu, Rangihaute, Hokorereoro (South East Island), and other nearby islands (making up the Chatham Islands). They arrived sometime between 1000 and 1400 CE''.

History

Origin 
The Moriori are ethnically Polynesian. They developed a distinct Moriori culture in the Chatham Islands as they adapted to local conditions. Although speculation once suggested that they settled the Chatham Islands directly from the tropical Polynesian islands, current research indicates that ancestral Moriori were Māori Polynesians who emigrated to the Chatham Islands from mainland New Zealand around 1500.

Evidence supporting this theory comes from the characteristics that the Moriori language has in common with the dialect of Māori spoken by the Ngāi Tahu tribe of the South Island, and comparisons of the genealogies of Moriori ("hokopapa") and Māori ("whakapapa"). Prevailing wind patterns in the southern Pacific add to the speculation that the Chatham Islands were the last part of the Pacific to be settled during the period of Polynesian discovery and colonisation. The word Moriori derives from Proto-Polynesian , which has the reconstructed meaning "true, real, genuine". It is cognate with the Māori language word Māori and likely also had the meaning "(ordinary) people".

Adapting to local conditions 

The Chathams are colder and less hospitable than the land the original settlers left behind, and although abundant in resources, these were different from those available where they had come from. The Chathams proved unsuitable for the cultivation of most crops known to Polynesians, and the Moriori adopted a hunter-gatherer lifestyle. Food was almost entirely marine-sourced — protein and fat from fish, fur seals, and the fatty young of sea birds. The islands supported about 2,000 people.

Lacking resources of cultural significance such as greenstone and plentiful timber, they found outlets for their ritual needs in the carving of dendroglyphs (incisions into tree trunks, called rakau momori). Typically, most Moriori dendroglyphs depict a human form but there are also other patterns depicting fish and birds. Some of these carvings are protected by the JM Barker (Hapupu) Historic Reserve.

As a small and precarious population, Moriori embraced a pacifist culture that rigidly avoided warfare, replacing it with dispute resolution in the form of ritual fighting and conciliation. The ban on warfare and cannibalism is attributed to their ancestor Nunuku-whenua.

This enabled the Moriori to preserve what limited resources they had in their harsh climate, avoiding waste through warfare. However, this lack of training in warfare also led to their later near-destruction at the hands of invading North Island Māori.

Moriori castrated some male infants in order to control population growth.

European contact (1791–1835)

The Chatham's captain, William R. Broughton, named the islands after his ship and claimed them for Great Britain. The landing party came to shore in Kaingaroa Harbour on the far Northeast coast of Chatham Island. The Moriori at first retreated into the forest once the Europeans landed. Seventy years later the Europeans would be recalled in Moriori oral tradition as containing the god of fire, given the pipes they were smoking and likely female from the clothes they were wearing. It was this interpretation that led to the men returning from the forest to meet the landing party. A brief period of hostility was quickly calmed by the crew putting gifts on the end of Moriori spears, though attempts at trade were unsuccessful. After exploring the area for water the crew again became fearful of Moriori aggression. Some misunderstanding led to an escalation of violence and one Moriori was shot and killed. HMS Chatham then left the island with all its crew. Both the diary of Broughton and local oral tradition record that both sides regretted the incident and to some extent blamed themselves for overreacting.

It was this regret in part that led to good relations when the next ships arrived in the islands sometime between 1804 and 1807. They were sealers from Sydney and word of their welcome soon gave the Moriori a reputation of being friendly. During this time at least one Moriori visited the New Zealand mainland and returned home with knowledge of the Māori. As more ships came, sealing gangs were also left behind on the islands for months at a time. Sealers and whalers soon made the islands a centre of their activities, competing for resources with the native population. Pigs and potatoes were introduced to the islands. However, the seals that had religious significance and provided food and clothing to the Moriori were all but wiped out. European men intermarried with Moriori. Māori arrivals created their own village at Wharekauri which became the Māori name for the Chatham Islands.

The local population was estimated at 1,600 in the mid-1830s with about 10% and 20% of the population having died from infectious diseases such as influenza. The effects of influenza were made more serious by the habit, also common to the Māori, of immersion in cold water.

Invasion by Taranaki Māori (1835–1868)

In 1835 some displaced Ngāti Mutunga and Ngāti Tama, from the Taranaki region, but living in Wellington, invaded the Chathams. On 19 November 1835, the brig Lord Rodney, a hijacked European ship, arrived carrying 500 Māori (men, women and children) with guns, clubs and axes, and loaded with 78 tonnes of potatoes for planting, followed by another load, by the same ship, of 400 more Māori on 5 December 1835. Before the second shipment of people arrived, the invaders killed a 12-year-old girl and hung her flesh on posts. They proceeded to enslave some Moriori and kill and cannibalise others, committing a genocide. With the arrival of the second group "parties of warriors armed with muskets, clubs and tomahawks, led by their chiefs, walked through Moriori tribal territories and settlements without warning, permission or greeting. If the districts were wanted by the invaders, they curtly informed the inhabitants that their land had been taken and the Moriori living there were now vassals."

A hui or council of Moriori elders was convened at the settlement called Te Awapatiki. Despite knowing that the Māori did not share their pacifism, and despite the admonition by some of the elder chiefs that the principle of Nunuku was not appropriate now, two chiefs — Tapata and Torea — declared that "the law of Nunuku was not a strategy for survival, to be varied as conditions changed; it was a moral imperative." Although this council decided in favour of peace, the invading Māori inferred it was a prelude to war, as was common practice during the Musket Wars. This precipitated a massacre, most complete in the Waitangi area followed by an enslavement of the Moriori survivors.

A Moriori survivor  recalled : "[The Māori] commenced to kill us like sheep.... [We] were terrified, fled to the bush, concealed ourselves in holes underground, and in any place to escape our enemies. It was of no avail; we were discovered and killed – men, women and children indiscriminately." A Māori conqueror explained, "We took possession... in accordance with our customs and we caught all the people. Not one escaped....." The invaders ritually killed some 10% of the population, a ritual that included staking out women and children on the beach and leaving them to die in great pain over several days.

During the following enslavement the Māori invaders forbade the speaking of the Moriori language. They forced Moriori to desecrate their sacred sites by urinating and defecating on them. Moriori were forbidden to marry Moriori or Māori, or to have children with each other. This was different from the customary form of slavery practised on mainland New Zealand. However, many Moriori women had children by their Māori masters. A small number of Moriori women eventually married either Māori or European men. Some were taken from the Chathams and never returned. In 1842 a small party of Māori and their Moriori slaves migrated to the subantarctic Auckland Islands, surviving for some 20 years on sealing and flax growing. Only 101 Moriori out of a population of about 2,000 were left alive by 1862, making the Moriori genocide one of the deadliest in history by percentage of the victim group.

Dispersal and assimilation 

The Moriori were free from slavery by the end of the 1860s which gave them opportunities for self determination, but their small population led to a gradual dilution of their culture. Only a handful of men still understood the Moriori language and culture from before the invasion. The younger generation spoke Māori, while still identifying themselves as Moriori. While attempts were made to record the Moriori culture for posterity, it was generally believed that it would never again be a living way of life. By 1900 there would only be twelve people in the Chatham Islands who identified themselves as Moriori. Although the last Moriori of unmixed ancestry, Tommy Solomon, died in 1933, there are several thousand mixed ancestry Moriori alive today.

In the 2001 New Zealand census, 585 people identified as Moriori. The population increased to 942 in the 2006 census and declined to 738 in the 2013 census. The 2018 census estimated the Moriori population as 996.

Waitangi Tribunal claim 
In the late 1980s some Moriori descendants made claims against the New Zealand government through the Waitangi Tribunal. The Tribunal is charged with making recommendations on claims brought by Māori relating to actions or omissions of the Crown in the period since 1840, which breach the promises made in the Treaty of Waitangi. These claims were the first time the Tribunal had to choose between competing claims of two indigenous groups. The main focus of the claim was the British annexation of the islands in 1842, the inaction of the Government to reports of Moriori being kept in slavery and the awarding of 97% of the islands to Ngati Mutunga in 1870 by the Native Land Court.

In 1992, while the Moriori claim was active, the Sealords fisheries deal ceded a third of New Zealand's fisheries to Māori, but prevented any further treaty fishery claims. This occurred against the backdrop of Māori, Moriori and Pākehā Chatham Islanders all competing for fishing rights, while working together to exclude international and mainland interests. Therefore, it was believed that the result of the Tribunals verdict on the ownership of the Chatham Islands may improve the Moriori ability to acquire some of the allotted fishing rights from the Sealords deal. The Moriori claims were heard between May 1994 and March 1996 and the verdict was strongly in favour of the Moriori case.

This in turn led to an NZ$18 million deal between the Crown and Moriori in 2017. The Crown and Moriori subsequently signed a Deed of Settlement on 13 August 2019. In November 2021, the New Zealand Parliament passed the Moriori Claims Settlement Bill, which completed the Treaty of Waitangi process of the Moriori. Under the terms of the legislation, the settlement package includes a formal Crown apology, the transfer of culturally and spiritually significant lands to Moriori as cultural redress, financial compensation of NZ$18 million, and shared redress such as the vesting of 50 percent of Te Whanga Lagoon.

Culture and marae

Today, despite the difficulties that the Moriori have faced, their culture is enjoying a renaissance, both in the Chatham Islands and New Zealand's mainland. This has been symbolised with the renewal of the Covenant of Peace at the new Kōpinga marae in January 2005 on Chatham Island. As of 2016, the marae has registered almost 800 Moriori descendants, with more than 3000 associated children. The Kopinga meeting place and Hokomenetai meeting house are based in the town of Waitangi, also on Chatham Island.

In 2001 work began on preserving the vocabulary and songs of the Moriori people. They also received a $6 million grant from the Government to preserve their culture and language. The albatross remains important in Moriori culture: it is seen in the design of the Kōpinga marae and its feathers are worn in the hair of some Moriori as a sign of peace. The relationship between the Moriori and Ngati Mutunga is improving, and non-violence remains a cornerstone of the Moriori self image.

In 2002 land on the east coast of Chatham Island was purchased by the Crown (the Taia property). It is now a reserve and jointly managed by Moriori and the Crown. The Moriori are also actively involved with preserving the rakau momori (tree carvings) on the islands.

Language 

English and to a lesser extent Māori are spoken by Moriori today. The now extinct Moriori language was Eastern Polynesian and closely related to Māori and Cook Island Māori with which it was mutually intelligible. It shared about 70% of its vocabulary with Māori; however, there were significant differences in grammar and pronunciation. There are modern attempts at creating learning materials to ensure the survival of what remains of the language.

Political organisation 
In 2001 the two main political groups of Moriori united to form the Hokotehi Moriori Trust; however, some internal disputes remain. The New Zealand Government recognises the Hokotehi Moriori Trust as having the mandate to represent Moriori in Treaty of Waitangi settlement negotiations. It is also a mandated iwi organisation under the Māori Fisheries Act 2004 and a recognised iwi aquaculture organisation in the Māori Commercial Aquaculture Claims Settlement Act 2004. The trust represents Moriori as an "iwi authority" for resource consents under the Resource Management Act 1991, and is a Tūhono organisation. The charitable trust is managed by ten trustees, with representation from both the Chatham Islands, and the North Island and South Island. It is based at Owenga on Chatham Island.

The Moriori in popular culture
Based on the writing of Percy Smith and Elsdon Best from the late 19th century, theories grew up that the Māori had displaced a more primitive pre-Māori population of Moriori (sometimes described as a small-statured, dark-skinned race of possible Melanesian origin), in mainland New Zealand – and that the Chatham Island Moriori were the last remnant of this earlier race. These theories also favoured the supposedly more recent and more technically able Māori. This was used to justify racist stereotyping, colonisation, and conquest by cultural "superiors". and – from the view of European settlers – of undermining the notion of the Māori as the indigenous people of New Zealand, making them just one in a progression of waves of migration and conquest by increasingly more civilised people.

The hypothesis of a racially distinct pre-Māori Moriori people was criticised in the 20th century by a number of historians, anthropologists and ethnologists; among them anthropologist H. D. Skinner in 1923, ethnologist Roger Duff in the 1940s, historian and ethnographer Arthur Thomson in 1959, as well as Michael King in Moriori: A People Rediscovered in 2000, James Belich in 2002, and K. R. Howe in Te Ara: The Encyclopedia of New Zealand.

The idea of Moriori arriving earlier and being vastly distinct from Māori was widely published in the early 20th century. Crucially, this story was also promoted in a series of three articles in the New Zealand School Journal of 1916, and the 1934 A. W. Reed schoolbook The Coming of the Maori to Ao-tea-roa—and therefore became familiar to generations of schoolchildren. This in turn has been repeated by the media and politicians. However, at no point has this idea completely dominated the discussion, with the academic consensus slowly gaining more public awareness over the 20th century.

The 2004 David Mitchell novel Cloud Atlas, and its 2012 film adaption both featured the enslavement of Moriori by the Maori on the Chatham Islands in the mid-19th century. Scholar Gabriel S. Estrada criticised the depiction of Maori slave culture as being incorrectly depicted in a similar manner to slavery in the United States, featuring enslaved Moriori working on plantations similar to those in the American South.  The interchangeability of these two practices has been noted by historians as being a common misconception in popular culture.

See also

 Chatham Islands
Moriori language

Notable Moriori

Joey Matenga Ashton
Christine Harvey
Nunuku-whenua
Kiti Karaka Riwai 
Tommy Solomon
 Hirawanu Tapu
 Torotoro

References

Sources

Further reading

External links
Moriori Claims Settlement Bill (Agreed Legal Account of Moriori History, noting Moriori to have arrived between 1000 and 1400 CE – not 1500AD)
Hokotehi Moriori Trust (Official Website)
Rekohu: Report on Moriori and Ngāti Mutunga Claims in the Chatham Islands
Moriori Education Resources (Official Website)
IPinCH Moriori database

 
Society of New Zealand
New Zealand pacifists
Ethnic groups in New Zealand
1835 in New Zealand
Indigenous peoples of Polynesia
Hunter-gatherers of Oceania